Peter Kopteff (born 10 April 1979) is a Finnish former footballer who played in the position of left winger.

Club career
Kopteff was born in Helsinki and began his career with HJK Helsinki and Jazz Pori before moving to Norway with Viking. He spent four years at Stavanger making over 100 Tippeligaen appearances. Whilst at Viking he scored one of the goals as they famously defeated Chelsea in the UEFA Cup in 2002. He joined English club Stoke City in December 2005. Kopteff failed to make any impact at Stoke making nine appearances in 2005–06 and was released at the end of the season. He then joined Dutch side FC Utrecht where he spent two years and on 31 August 2008 Kopteff signed a short-term contract to play for Aalesund for the remainder of the 2008 season. The contract was later extended for the 2009 season at the end of which he decided to retire.

International career
Kopteff used to be a regular squad member of the Finland national football team. Due to his lack of first-team football caused by an injury during his second season in Utrecht, he has not played international football since 2007, only limiting him to occasional call-ups. He has been capped 39 times and scored once. He was recalled to the national team in April 2009 against Norway.

Career statistics

Club
Sources:

International
Source:

References

External links
 Voetbal international profile
 Guardian Football
 

1979 births
Living people
Eredivisie players
FC Utrecht players
Finland international footballers
Finnish expatriate footballers
Finnish expatriate sportspeople in England
Expatriate footballers in England
Finnish expatriate sportspeople in Norway
Expatriate footballers in Norway
Finnish expatriate sportspeople in the Netherlands
Expatriate footballers in the Netherlands
Finnish footballers
Association football wingers
Helsingin Jalkapalloklubi players
Footballers from Helsinki
Stoke City F.C. players
Viking FK players
FC Jazz players
Veikkausliiga players
Eliteserien players
Finnish people of Hungarian descent
English Football League players